The Church of Jesus Christ of Latter-day Saints in New Hampshire refers to the Church of Jesus Christ of Latter-day Saints (LDS Church) and its members in New Hampshire.

Official church membership as a percentage of general population was 0.61% in 2014. According to the 2014 Pew Forum on Religion & Public Life survey, roughly 1% of Granite Staters self-identify themselves most closely with the LDS Church. The LDS Church is the 6th largest denomination in New Hampshire.

History

Orson Pratt and Lyman E. Johnson arrived in New Hampshire in 1832 as missionaries and stayed for 26 days and baptized 20 people.

In 2006, Bryson C. Cook was called as stake president of the Concord, New Hampshire stake.

A regional gathering including members from New Hampshire was held in 2019 with 12,000 people gathered at the DCU Center in Worcester, Massachusetts to listen to M. Russell Ballard.

Stakes and Congregations
As of February 2023, New Hampshire had the following stakes and congregations:

Concord New Hampshire Stake
Ascutney Ward (Vermont)
Bedford Ward
Canterbury Ward
Colebrook Branch
Concord Ward
Hanover Ward
Laconia Ward
Lebanon Ward
Manchester 1st Ward
Plymouth Ward
Randolph Branch
Wolfeboro Branch

Exeter New Hampshire Stake
Derry Ward
Exeter Ward
Georgetown Ward
Portsmouth Ward
Sanford Ward (Maine)
Somersworth Ward

Nashua New Hampshire Stake
Heritage Park YSA Ward (Massachusetts)
Keene Ward
Lowell 1st Ward (Massachusetts)
Lowell 2nd Branch (Portuguese) (Massachusetts)
Merrimack Ward
Nashua 1st Ward
Nashua 2nd Branch (Spanish)
Peterborough Ward

Mission
 New Hampshire Manchester Mission

See also

Religion in New Hampshire

References

External links
 Newsroom (New Hampshire)
 The Church of Jesus Christ of Latter-day Saints official site
 ComeUntoChrist.org Latter-day Saints visitor site

Christianity in New Hampshire
Latter Day Saint movement in New Hampshire
New Hampshire